Miami Valley Today (formerly the Troy Daily News) is an American semi-weekly newspaper published Wednesdays and Sundays in Troy, Ohio. It is owned by AIM Media Midwest.

In addition to Troy, Miami Valley Today circulates in several communities of Miami County, Ohio, including Casstown, Conover, Covington, Fletcher, Piqua, Pleasant Hill, Tipp City and West Milton. Miami Valley Today is printed in Miamisburg.

History 
The newspaper was founded as a daily in 1909.

In 1955, the newspaper was bought by George Kuser. He owned the paper until 1998. Kuser was an eccentric businessman who lived abroad in Africa, Italy and Turkey for much of that time. Upon his returns to Troy, he sometimes lived in an apartment built atop the Daily News' newsroom. In the late 1990s, Daily News employees bought stock in the company through an innovative employee stock ownership program.

Pulitzer, Inc., of St. Louis, Missouri, bought the paper and its commercial printing operations in November 1998, intending to build a regional chain. Instead, the company sold the Daily News for an undisclosed price to Brown Publishing Company, which already owned several properties in the area.

Brown, a Cincinnati-based family business, purchased the Daily News in April 2001, integrating it with the Piqua Daily Call and Sidney Daily News as its "I-75 Group", sharing the printing plant at Tipp City. In February 2009, these three newspapers stopped printing Tuesday editions because of the weak economy, reducing the Troy paper to six publication days per week, including the Miami Valley Sunday News.

Brown Publishing filed for Chapter 11 bankruptcy protection on April 30, 2010; its Ohio assets, including 14 daily newspapers and about 30 weeklies, were transferred to a new business, Ohio Community Media, which was purchased in May 2011 by Philadelphia-based Versa Capital Management.

In 2012 Versa merged Ohio Community Media, former Freedom papers it had acquired, Impressions Media, and Heartland Publications into a new company, Civitas Media. Civitas Media sold its Ohio papers to AIM Media Midwest, a subsidiary of AIM Media Management, in 2017.

On December 5, 2018, AIM Media Midwest merged the Troy Daily News and Piqua Daily Call into a single daily newspaper, Miami Valley Today. The two former rival newspapers moved into a single newsroom in a building across the street from the Miami County Fairgrounds, roughly midway between the two cities. The merger eventually resulted in staffing cuts.

In February 2023, Miami Valley Today reduced its publishing schedule to Wednesdays and Sundays as part of cost-cutting across AIM Media Midwest.

Alumni 

The Troy Daily News had produced several well-known journalists, especially photojournalists. Among the alumni are:

 Howard Wilkinson, longtime political reporter for the Cincinnati Enquirer
 Ben Sutherly, health reporter at the Columbus Dispatch
 Scott Elliott, bureau chief at Chalkbeat Indiana and former education reporter at the Indianapolis Star
 Tyler Hicks, international photographer for The New York Times and winner of the 2014 Pulitzer Prize for Breaking News Photography
 Chris Hondros, war photographer for Getty Images
 Spencer Platt, international photographer with Getty Images
 Chris Usher, Washington, D.C.-based freelance photojournalist
 Mike Laughlin, photojournalist at the South Florida Sun-Sentinel
 Vincent J. Musi, a photographer with National Geographic
 Rick Wilson, Florida-based freelance sports photographer
 J.D. Pooley, photojournalist at the Bowling Green Sentinel-Tribune in Ohio and a frequent contributor to national newspapers and magazines.
 Steve Hebert, a freelance photographer in Kansas City.
 Jim Witmer, Dayton Daily News photographer

References

External links 
 
 Miami Valley Today Archives at NewsBank
 Miami Valley Today Archives at NewsMemory

Newspapers published in Ohio
Miami County, Ohio
Publications established in 1909
1909 establishments in Ohio